Sigbjørn Slinning (born 6 Oktober 1945) is a Norwegian former international football player. 

Born in Stavanger, he played for the club Viking FK from his youth and during his whole career. He made his debut on the first team in 1962, 17 years old, and played a total of 523 games for the first team between 1962 and 1976. With Viking, he won the  Norwegian football league four times, in 1972, 1973, 1974 and 1975.

He was capped on youth and U21 level, and played 42 matches for the Norwegian national team between 1969 and 1976.

References

External links 
 

1945 births
Living people
Sportspeople from Stavanger
Norwegian footballers
Viking FK players
Norway youth international footballers
Norway under-21 international footballers
Norway international footballers
Association football defenders